Ça Va (French for "okay", literally "that goes") is a studio album by German/British avant-pop group Slapp Happy, recorded in London in 1997. Slapp Happy had reunited to make this album and (unlike all their previous albums) they played all the instruments themselves. They also used a digital studio to produce a layered sound on many of the tracks.

The V2 Records release of the album in Japan included a bonus track.

Track listing

Personnel
Anthony Moore – keyboards, programming, guitars, saz (bağlama), toy theremin, percussion, melodica, vocals (lead on "Coralie")
Peter Blegvad – guitars, bass, percussion, vocals (lead on "Powerful Stuff")
Dagmar Krause – vocals, piano ("Is it You?")

Sound and art work
Laurie Latham – producer
Peter Blegvad – cover art work

References

External links
Peter Blegvad Discography
Slapp Happy: Ça Va (archived 26 October 2009)

1998 albums
Slapp Happy albums
V2 Records albums
Albums produced by Laurie Latham
Avant-pop albums